Nevis is an island in the Caribbean and part of the Federation of Saint Kitts and Nevis.

Nevis may also refer to:

Places
 Nevis, Alberta, a hamlet in Canada
 Nevis, Iran, a village in Qom Province
 Nevis, Minnesota, small town in the US
 Ben Nevis, the highest mountain in the British Isles, located in Scotland
 Glen Nevis, a glen in Lochaber, Highland, Scotland
 Loch Nevis, a sea loch on the west coast of Scotland, not associated with Ben Nevis
 Nevis range, a ski area near Ben Nevis, Scotland
 River Nevis, a river near Ben Nevis in Scotland
 Nevis River, a river in New Zealand
 Nevis Highwire Platform, a Bungee platform above the Nevis River

Other uses
 Edwin C. Nevis (1926–2011), American psychologist
 Nevis Laboratories, operated by Columbia University
 Nevisport, an outdoor clothing firm founded in Fort William, near Ben Nevis

See also
 Knock Nevis, a Norwegian owned supertanker
 Nevus, a number of different, usually benign, pigmented lesions of the skin, including most birthmarks and moles
 Dysplastic nevus, an atypical mole whose appearance is different from that of common moles